The 1998–99 NBA season was the Timberwolves' 10th season in the National Basketball Association. On March 23, 1998, the owners of all 29 NBA teams voted 27–2 to reopen the league's collective bargaining agreement, seeking changes to the league's salary cap system, and a ceiling on individual player salaries. The National Basketball Players Association (NBPA) opposed to the owners' plan, and wanted raises for players who earned the league's minimum salary. After both sides failed to reach an agreement, the owners called for a lockout, which began on July 1, 1998, putting a hold on all team trades, free agent signings and training camp workouts, and cancelling many NBA regular season and preseason games. Due to the lockout, the NBA All-Star Game, which was scheduled to be played in Philadelphia on February 14, 1999, was also cancelled. However, on January 6, 1999, NBA commissioner David Stern, and NBPA director Billy Hunter finally reached an agreement to end the lockout. The deal was approved by both the players and owners, and was signed on January 20, ending the lockout after 204 days. The regular season began on February 5, and was cut short to just 50 games instead of the regular 82-game schedule.

During the off-season, the Timberwolves signed free agents Joe Smith, and Malik Sealy, and acquired second-year guard Bobby Jackson, and Dean Garrett (who previously played for the T-Wolves during the 1996–97 season) from the Denver Nuggets in a three-team trade during the off-season. In a three-team midseason trade, the Timberwolves dealt Stephon Marbury along with Chris Carr to the New Jersey Nets, and acquired Terrell Brandon from the Milwaukee Bucks, while signing free agent and three-point specialist Dennis Scott, who was previously released by the New York Knicks. The Timberwolves got off to a fast start winning eight of their first ten games, but played below .500 for most of the remaining season. They finished fourth in the Midwest Division with a 25–25 record, and made their third consecutive trip to the playoffs, winning a tie-breaker for the #8 seed in the Western Conference over the Seattle SuperSonics.

Kevin Garnett averaged 20.8 points, 10.4 rebounds and 1.8 blocks per game, and was named to the All-NBA Third Team, while Smith averaged 13.7 points, 8.2 rebounds and 1.5 blocks per game, and Sam Mitchell provided the team with 11.2 points per game. In addition, Anthony Peeler contributed 9.6 points per game in only 28 games due to a strained left calf injury, while off the bench, Sealy contributed 8.1 points per game in only 31 games, Jackson provided with 7.1 points and 3.3 assists per game, and Garrett, the team's starting center, averaged 5.5 points and 5.2 rebounds per game.

However, in the Western Conference First Round of the playoffs, the T-Wolves would lose in four games to the San Antonio Spurs. The Spurs would reach the NBA Finals for the first time to defeat the 8th-seeded New York Knicks in five games, winning their first ever championship. Following the season, Scott signed with the Vancouver Grizzlies. For the season, the Timberwolves added new black alternate road uniforms, which would remain in use until 2008.

Draft picks

Roster

Regular season

Season standings

z - clinched division title
y - clinched division title
x - clinched playoff spot

Record vs. opponents

Game log

Playoffs

|- align="center" bgcolor="#ffcccc"
| 1
| May 9
| @ San Antonio
| L 86–99
| Kevin Garnett (21)
| Brandon, Garnett (8)
| Terrell Brandon (11)
| Alamodome22,356
| 0–1
|- align="center" bgcolor="#ccffcc"
| 2
| May 11
| @ San Antonio
| W 80–71
| Kevin Garnett (23)
| Kevin Garnett (12)
| Terrell Brandon (9)
| Alamodome22,494
| 1–1
|- align="center" bgcolor="#ffcccc"
| 3
| May 13
| San Antonio
| L 71–85
| Kevin Garnett (23)
| Kevin Garnett (12)
| three players tied (2)
| Target Center17,444
| 1–2
|- align="center" bgcolor="#ffcccc"
| 4
| May 15
| San Antonio
| L 85–92
| Terrell Brandon (27)
| Kevin Garnett (6)
| Brandon, Garnett (6)
| Target Center15,898
| 1–3
|-

Player statistics

NOTE: Please write the players statistics in alphabetical order by last name.

Season

Playoffs

Awards and records
 Kevin Garnett, All-NBA Third Team

Transactions

References

See also
 1998-99 NBA season

Minnesota Timberwolves seasons
1999 in sports in Minnesota
1998 in sports in Minnesota
Monnesota